The Torneo Internazionale Regione Piemonte (also called the Biella Challenger) was a women's professional tournament played on outdoor clay courts. The event was classified as a $100k ITF Women's Circuit tournament, and held annually in Biella, Italy, from 2000 to 2012.

History
The tournament began as a $10k event in 2000. It was upgraded to a $25k event in 2001. From 2002 to 2006, it was a $50k event. Since 2007, it has been a $100k event.

Past finals

Singles

Doubles

References
http://www.itftennis.com/procircuit/tournaments/women's-calendar.aspx?tour=biella&reg=EUR&nat=&sur=&cate=AL&iod=&fromDate=01-05-1960&toDate=31-05-2012

ITF Women's World Tennis Tour
Clay court tennis tournaments
Tennis in Italy
Sport in Piedmont
Tennis tournaments in Italy
Recurring sporting events established in 2000
Recurring sporting events disestablished in 2012
Defunct tennis tournaments in Italy
2000 establishments in Italy
2012 disestablishments in Italy